George Edwards Porter (born 27 June 1992) is an English professional footballer who plays as either a winger or a striker for Dulwich Hamlet.

Career

Cray Wanderers
Born in Sidcup, Porter joined Isthmian League Premier Division side Cray Wanderers for the 2009–10 season. After playing several games for the academy at Coopers Technology College in Chislehurst, Porter was promoted to the first team, making his debut in the FA Cup. His first goal for Cray came in a 3–2 win over Margate. After impressive performances for the first team, Porter attracted interest from several Football League teams including Charlton Athletic, Gillingham, Dagenham & Redbridge and Leyton Orient. He left Cray Wanderers after playing 41 games and scoring 11 goals in all competitions. His success was rewarded with the Manager's Player of the Year award.

Leyton Orient
Porter joined Leyton Orient on a two-week trial in May 2010, playing in several reserve games, and he was signed by the O's in May 2010. He made his first appearance in an Orient shirt in a friendly match against his old club on 14 July 2010, winning a penalty in a 2–0 win. His league debut came in the 3–1 defeat at home to Charlton Athletic on 13 August, when he appeared as a substitute.

On 29 October 2010, after a period of illness, Porter signed on a month's loan to Conference South club Lewes. He made his debut for the Rooks on 30 October, in the 1–1 draw with Dartford. In his next game, a 3–0 win at Weston-super-Mare, Porter scored his first goal for Lewes, but was later sent off. Porter's Lewes loan was extended, but at the end of January 2011, he went on loan to Hastings United, where he made his debut in the 2–2 draw at home to Folkestone Invicta on 1 February. He scored his first goal for Hastings in the 3–2 victory over Tooting & Mitcham United on 12 February. At the end of the season, Porter returned to Orient and scored a hat-trick for the O's in a 5–0 demolition of Finnish second division side SJK during their pre-season tour of Finland.

He made his first start for Orient and scored his first professional goal on 17 September 2011, in the 3–1 defeat at home to Oldham Athletic. A string of impressive performances, including a goal in his FA Cup début against Bromley, soon saw him attract interest from the likes of Nottingham Forest and Ipswich Town. On 23 May 2012 Porter rejected a two-year contract offer from Leyton Orient leaving the club to expect his departure.

Burnley
On 3 July 2012, Porter signed for Football League Championship club Burnley on a three-year contract. Porter picked up an injury before the start of the season.

Colchester United
He signed on a youth loan for Colchester United on 1 January 2013 until the end of the season and made his début the same day, coming on after 73 minutes as a sub in the 3–0 defeat at Crawley.

AFC Wimbledon
On 18 July 2013, it was announced that Porter had joined League Two side AFC Wimbledon on a season-long loan deal. AFC Wimbledon manager Neal Ardley said of Porter joining "The Dons" that "the pacy forward is likely to be utilised on the flank" and "George is very quick and direct; he will give us real high energy and creativity in the final third", with Porter himself stating that he "cannot wait to get started at AFC Wimbledon having been impressed by the club's support in the past". Porter made his first appearance for "The Dons" two days later in a pre-season friendly game against Conference South side Sutton United at Gander Green Lane that resulted in a 4–0 win. However, he was substituted after only six minutes due to an injury, though this did look more precautionary than anything serious. On 24 January 2014, Porter returned to Burnley early from his loan after falling out of favour at Wimbledon, amid rumours of a training ground bust up with manager Neal Ardley. He made a total of 24 appearances scoring no goals.

2014–15
On 31 January 2014, Porter signed for Rochdale on a short-term deal until the end of the season, following his departure from Burnley. He subsequently joined League Two club Dagenham & Redbridge before returning to the Isthmian League Premier Division and joining leaders Maidstone United.

Welling United
In July 2015, he signed for National League side Welling United on a free transfer.

Bromley and 12 month ban
In June 2016, Porter signed for fellow National League side Bromley following his departure from relegated Welling United. Despite missing a considerable period through injury, Porter made 31 league appearances, scoring 6 goals, and was rewarded with a new one-year contract at the end of the season.

In September 2019, Porter was banned from football for 12 months after pleading guilty to placing 473 bets on football matches, an activity which is banned by the FA. He was also fined £750. He was initially reported to the FA by betting company Bet365 for placing the bets between December 2011 and May 2019. Porter made a loss on the bets and did not bet on matches involving his own teams, and was not accused of match fixing.

Return to Maidstone
After his ban, Porter re-signed for Maidstone in late September 2020.

Dartford
On 8 June 2021, Porter signed for Dartford.

Dulwich Hamlet
On 1 July 2022, Porter signed for Dulwich Hamlet.

Career statistics

Honours
Bromley
FA Trophy runner-up: 2017–18

Dartford
Kent Senior Cup: 2019–20

References

External links

 

1992 births
Living people
Footballers from Sidcup
English footballers
Association football wingers
Association football forwards
Cray Wanderers F.C. players
Leyton Orient F.C. players
Lewes F.C. players
Hastings United F.C. players
Burnley F.C. players
Colchester United F.C. players
AFC Wimbledon players
Rochdale A.F.C. players
Dagenham & Redbridge F.C. players
Maidstone United F.C. players
Welling United F.C. players
Bromley F.C. players
Dartford F.C. players
Dulwich Hamlet F.C. players
English Football League players
National League (English football) players
Isthmian League players